Donny de Groot (born 16 August 1979) is a Dutch former professional footballer who played as a striker.

Club career

Early career 
De Groot started his football career with amateur side UNIO in Oudewater, near his native town Gouda. As a youth player, he moved to FC Utrecht, where he made his debut for the main squad on 27 February 2000, in the home game against AZ. During the next two and a half years in Utrecht, De Groot played only five matches for the main squad. During the 2001–02 season, De Groot moved to FC Volendam, where he scored 9 goals in 15 matches. De Groot moved to FC Emmen for the next season. His 30 goals in 31 matches made him top scorer of the 2002–03 Eerste Divisie.

Success and career abroad 
He returned to FC Utrecht for the 2003–04 Eredivisie season; he played 23 matches, scoring 5 goals. At the end of the season, De Groot moved to RBC Roosendaal, and during the 2005–06 Eredivisie season, he went to Eerste Divisie side De Graafschap. At the end of the season, De Groot moved abroad, signing a two-year deal with AEK Larnaca of Cyprus. De Groot played for the Cypriot side for only one season, and returned to De Graafschap for the 2007–08 Eredivisie season.

On 30 January 2009, he went to Newcastle Jets on a free transfer. On 10 March 2009, he made his debut for Newcastle in their 2–0 loss in the AFC Champions League to Beijing Guoan. De Groot fell out of favour under new manager Branko Čulina and was given permission to negotiate with other clubs.

Return home 
Therefore, he went to back to his home country where he signed with Go Ahead Eagles on a free transfer in January 2010. He immediately made an impact, scoring two goals as a jet lagged second-half substitute in a Dutch Cup quarter finals away win over Eredivisie side NAC Breda. He had only finished his long journey from Australia less than 24 hours earlier. In June 2011 it was reported that he would sign a contract at Tilburgian side Willem II Tilburg.

Honours

Club
FC Utrecht
KNVB Cup: 2003–04

RKC Waalwijk:
Eerste Divisie: 2010–11

Individual
Eerste Divisie Player of the Year: 2002–03
Eerste Divisie Top scorer: 2002–03

References

External links 
 Newcastle Jets profile
 Donny de Groot Interview
 Donny on the spot: Jets sense Dutch of class in de Groot

1979 births
Living people
Footballers from Gouda, South Holland
Dutch footballers
Dutch expatriate footballers
De Graafschap players
RBC Roosendaal players
FC Volendam players
FC Utrecht players
FC Emmen players
RKC Waalwijk players
Go Ahead Eagles players
AEK Larnaca FC players
Newcastle Jets FC players
Willem II (football club) players
Sint-Truidense V.V. players
FC Eindhoven players
Fortuna Sittard players
Eerste Divisie players
Eredivisie players
Cypriot First Division players
A-League Men players
Challenger Pro League players
Expatriate footballers in Cyprus
Expatriate soccer players in Australia
Expatriate footballers in Belgium
Dutch expatriate sportspeople in Belgium
Dutch expatriate sportspeople in Cyprus
Dutch expatriate sportspeople in Australia
Association football forwards